Célia Aymonier (born 5 August 1991) is a former French cross-country skier and biathlete. She competed as a cross-country skier at the 2014 Winter Olympics in Sochi, competing in the skiathlon and the 10 km classical.

Ahead of the 2015–16 season, Aymonier changed sport to biathlon and became a part of the French elite biathlon team. She competed at the 2018 Winter Olympics. She retired after the 2019–20 season.

Biathlon results

Olympic Games

World Championships
1 medal (1 bronze)

*During Olympic seasons competitions are only held for those events not included in the Olympic program.
**The single mixed relay was added as an event in 2019.

Biathlon World Cup
World Cup rankings

Relay victories

3 victories

Cross-country skiing results
All results are sourced from the International Ski Federation (FIS).

Olympic Games

World Championships

World Cup

Season standings

References

External links
 
 
 
 
 
 

1991 births
Living people
People from Pontarlier
French female biathletes
French female cross-country skiers
Tour de Ski skiers
Cross-country skiers at the 2014 Winter Olympics
Olympic cross-country skiers of France
Biathlon World Championships medalists
Olympic biathletes of France
Biathletes at the 2018 Winter Olympics
Sportspeople from Doubs
21st-century French women